Lowie Vermeersch (born May 9, 1974) is a Flemish designer, part of the third generation of a prominent artistic family. He is the Founder & Creative Director of Granstudio in Turin, Italy.

Previously, he held the position of Design Director at Pininfarina. In 2010, Automobile Magazine ranked him number 12 in the list of "World's 25 Most Influential Car Designers".

Background

Lowie Vermeersch was born on May 9, 1974 in Kortrijk, Belgium. He is part of a prominent Flemish artistic family. His grandfather, José Vermeersch (1922-1997), was one of the most important Flemish sculptors of the post-war period. His father, Rik Vermeersch (1949), and Lowie Vermeersch's three brothers, Pieter Vermeersch (1973), Robin Vermeersch (1977) and Tinus Vermeersch (1976), are all artists.

He studied Industrial Design Engineering at Delft University of Technology. 
 
In 1997, he obtained an internship at Pininfarina, during which he developed his graduation project. With this project - the research and design of a car for 2012 - he graduated in 1998 as “Master of Science in Industrial Design Engineering” with first class honors. Later he was given an award for "Best Graduate Industrial Design Engineering" of the year 1997-1998.

In October 2010, the Belgian TV channel Canvas dedicated a documentary to his story and professional achievements.

Career

Pininfarina 
Immediately after his graduation Vermeersch joined Pininfarina, where he contributed to the design of many successful cars and prototypes such as Metrocubo (interior) and Ford Start (interior). In particular he was responsible for both the concept design and styling of the exterior and interior of the Pininfarina Nido safety concept car, which was presented at the 2004 Paris Motor Show and awarded with the prestigious Compasso d’Oro design award.

In July 2005, he was promoted to the role of Chief Designer, leading one of the three Pininfarina design teams. During this period, he worked on many production cars for Pininfarina's traditional clients, such as Ferrari and Peugeot, and cars for emerging markets such as the Chinese JAC B18 and the Brilliance Splendor SW, both presented at the 2008 Beijing Auto Show.

As Chief Designer, he participated to the design of the Ferrari California that was unveiled at the 2008 Paris Motor Show, and followed the complete development of the Maserati Birdcage 75th, presented at the 2005 Geneva Motor Show. The Birdcage 75th won numerous awards, including the 2006 Louis Vuitton Classic Concept Car Award.

In 2005, he also co-operated with the Istituto Europeo di Design (IED) in Turin. As coordinator of the institute's master's degree, he led the Fiat X1/99 concept car project that was presented at the 2005 Geneva Motor Show.

On August 1, 2007, at age 33, he was appointed Design Director at Pininfarina, leading a group of nearly one hundred specialized people that combined a young vision with the firm's long design experience. His day-to-day responsibilities included the direction of all the Pininfarina automotive design activities for customers including Ferrari, Fiat Group Automobiles, Maserati, Ford, Peugeot, Brilliance, Chery, and JAC.

As Design Director he was further responsible for the Pininfarina Sintesi concept car, the electric Bollore B0 and the Alfa Romeo 2uettottanta  and oversaw the design of the Ferrari FF and Ferrari 458.

Granstudio
In December 2010, Vermeersch resigned from his position at Pininfarina in order to found Granstudio, a new type of design house that allowed him to extend his automotive design experience into the field of mobility design.

His studio is now a multidisciplinary team of 40 creatives and is active both in the field of automotive design and mobility design. The studio mixes often confidential consultancy work for international clients with independent research projects.

With his studio, he was responsible for the design of the Chery TX concept, that was unveiled at the 2012 Shanghai Motor Show. The TX was awarded Best Concept Car of the Year 2012 by Car Design News. From this concept, the Tiggo 7 was derived as a production car and won the title "Best Production Car Design China" in 2016.

In collaboration with Paolo Garella, his studio designed James Glickenhaus's road/racing SCG003C and SCG003S for Scuderia Cameron Glickenhaus, led by Goran Popovic. The SCG003C was unveiled at the 2015 Geneva Motor Show and subsequently raced in the 24 Hours Nürburgring, where it took a shock pole position in 2017 aided by its highly aerodynamic design.

In recent years his studio designed productions cars such as the BAIC Senova D50, Cowin X3 and Senova D70 and concept studies.

The Senova OffSpace concept car that was presented in 2016 as part of an ongoing collaboration with BAIC Motor received critical acclaim and was awarded Best Concept Car China of 2016.

In November 2017 Lowie Vermeersch presented together with Dallara the Dallara Stradale, the first ever road going car from the world leading race engineering company that is based in Parma, Italy. He designed the car together with Giovanni Piccardo (exterior) and Rocco Carrieri (interior).

During an interview with motor1.com Lowie Vermeersch explained how this diversity of projects, between sportscars and the mobility projects in which the studio is involved, fits within his broader vision on mobility in which he forecasts a growing diversity of types of vehicles to fit better and more efficiently different types of needs and contexts. A similar way of thinking was already part of his TedX talk in 2011.

In August 2019,  the Lowie Vermeersch designed Drako GTE was launched at the Quail Motorsports Gathering during Monterey Car Week

Biennale Interieur
From 2011 to 2017, Lowie Vermeersch served (besides his activities in Granstudio) as president of board of directors of the Interieur Foundation, a non-profit association acting in the field of design, product development and innovation. The foundation organizes a design Biennale, awarded with the European Community Design Prize in 1994 and the Design Management Europe Award in 2008. Vermeersch acted as Curator for the Interieur Biennale in 2012  and was praised by Wallpaper for "setting a new standard for the design fair experience".

Designs

Some of the projects that were developed under his direction include:
 Alfa Romeo 2uettottanta (Best Concept Car of the Year 2010)
 Chery Tiggo 7
 Chery TX (Best Concept Car of the Year 2012)
 Cowin i-CX
 Cowin X3
 Cowin Xuandu
 Eurostar High Speed Train
 Ferrari 458 Italia (Best of Show Frankfurt Motor Show 2009; numerous awards)
 Ferrari FF
 Lightyear One
 Maserati GranCabrio
 Maserati Birdcage 75th (Louis Vuitton Classic Concept Car Award)
 Pininfarina B0
 Pininfarina Nido (Most Beautiful Car in the World; ADI Compasso d'Oro)
 Pininfarina Sintesi (Red Dot Award)
 Prinoth Beast (snow groomer)
 Scuderia Cameron Glickenhaus SCG003
 Tata Pr1ma
 Drako GTE

References

External links 
 Interieur
 Pininfarina
 Granstudio

1974 births
Living people
Belgian automobile designers
Pininfarina people
People from Kortrijk
Delft University of Technology alumni